William Marshall (c.1817–25 April 1906) was a New Zealand teacher and clergyman. He was born in London, in c.1817.

References

1817 births
1906 deaths
New Zealand schoolteachers
People from London
English emigrants to New Zealand